Neil Gaiman's Only The End of the World Again is a 2000 compilation of a serialized fantasy story published by Oni Press and originally appearing in Oni Double Feature #6–8 during 1998. The story was created and written by Neil Gaiman, adapted to comic by P. Craig Russell, illustrated by Troy Nixey and was colored for the collection by Matthew Hollingsworth.

The story concerns the character of Lawrence Talbot, a claims adjustor and werewolf who finds himself in Innsmouth on a cold winter's night with the townspeople trying to bring about the return of the Elder Gods. It was written as a tribute to Roger Zelazny, and inspired by his novel A Night in the Lonesome October.

The title Only the End of the World Again comes from the Hitchhiker's Guide to the Galaxy franchise.

References

1994 short stories
1998 comics debuts
Comics by Neil Gaiman
Short stories by Neil Gaiman
Fantasy short stories
Oni Press titles
Cthulhu Mythos short stories
Cthulhu Mythos comics
Works originally published in American magazines
Works originally published in fantasy fiction magazines